The Onzole Formation is an Early Pliocene (Montehermosan to Chapadmalalan in the SALMA classification) geologic formation in the Borbón Basin of northwestern Ecuador. The formation consists of a shallow marine sandstone member containing many fish fossils, among which megalodon, and a deep water member comprising tuffaceous shales and mudstones containing gastropods, bivalves and scaphopods.

Subdivision 
The formation consists of the Esmeraldas Member, which is a unit comprising highly foraminiferal tuffaceous calcareous shale.

The Esmeraldas Member is covered by the Súa Member comprising burrowed, bioturbated, silty sandstones deposited in a coastal environment.

Fossil content 
The formation has provided bivalve, gastropod, and scaphopod fossils and the following vertebrates:

 Carcharhinus egertoni, C. priscus
 Carcharocles megalodon
 Diaphus ecuadorensis
 Galeocerdo aduncus
 Hemipristis serra
 Isistius triangulus
 Negaprion eurybathrodon
 Odontaspis acutissima
 Rhizoprionodon taxandriae
 Brotula cf. ordwayi
 Chilara taylori
 Eucinostomus cf. currani
 Larimus cf. pacificus
 Lepophidium borbonensis, L. limulum
 Lepophidium microlepis
 Merluccius cf. angustimanus
 Orthopristis cf. cantharinus
 Otophidium indefatigabile
 Paraconger californiensis
 Porichthys analis, Porichthys margaritatus, Porichthys cf. notatus
 Stellifer onzole
 Anchoa sp.
 Apogon sp.
 Citharichthys sp.
 Diaphus sp.
 Haemulon sp.
 Lampadena sp.
 Apogonidae indet.
 Cynoglossidae indet.
 Gobiidae indet.
 Gerreidae indet.
 Opistognathidae indet.
 Pleuronectidae indet.
 ?Serranidae indet.

See also 
 List of fossiliferous stratigraphic units in Ecuador

References

Bibliography

Further reading 
 G. Carnevale, W. Landini, L. Radgaini, C. Celma, G. and Cantalamessa. 2011. Taphonomic and paleoecological analyses (mollusks and fishes) of the Súa Member condensed shelled, upper Onzole Formation (Early Pliocene, Ecuador). Palaios 26(3):160-172
 A. E. Longbottom. 1979. Miocene Sharks' teeth from Ecuador. Bulletin of The British Museum (Natural History) Geology 32:57-70
 W. D. Pitt and L.J. Pitt. 1997. Nassarius (Mollusca: Neogastropoda) from the Neogene of northwestern Ecuador. Tulane Studies in Geology and Paleontology 29:135-150
 E. H. Vokes and H. E. Vokes. 2000. Catalogue of Tulane University fossil localities
 E. H. Vokes. 1988. Muricidae (Mollusca: Gastropoda) of the Esmeraldas Beds, northwestern Ecuador. Tulane Studies in Geology and Paleontology 21(1):1-50

Geologic formations of Ecuador
Pliocene Series of South America
Neogene Ecuador
Chapadmalalan
Montehermosan
Shale formations
Mudstone formations
Sandstone formations
Deep marine deposits
Shallow marine deposits
Paleontology in Ecuador
Formations